The granulated Tasmanian snail (Anoglypta launcestonensis) is a species of air-breathing land snail, a terrestrial pulmonate gastropod mollusk in the family Caryodidae. The specific epithet launcestonensis references Launceston, Tasmania.

Distribution 
This species is endemic to Australia.

References

Caryodidae
Gastropods described in 1853
Taxonomy articles created by Polbot